Amphipneustes bifidus is a species of sea urchin of the family Temnopleuridae. Their armour is covered with spines. It is placed in the genus Amphipneustes and lives in the sea. Amphipneustes bifidus was first scientifically described in 1950 by Ole Mortensen, a Danish scientist.

See also 
Ammotrophus cyclius
Ammotrophus platyterus
Amphipneustes brevisternalis

References 

Amphipneustes
Animals described in 1950
Taxa named by Ole Theodor Jensen Mortensen